Margaret Ralston Gest (1900-1965) was an American painter. She was a member of the Philadelphia Ten.

Biography
Gest was born in 1900 in Philadelphia, Pennsylvania. Gest was known for her Cubist style, primarily in watercolors and multicultural approach.

From 1927 through 1960 Gest exhibited regularly at the Pennsylvania Academy of the Fine Arts. She was a member of the Philadelphia Water Color Club, the Contemporary Club, the North Shore Art Association, the Plastic Club, and the Woodmere Gallery. 

Gest lived most of the year in Philadelphia. spending summers in Gloucester, Massachusetts. She died in 1965.

Legacy
In 1977 her library was auctioned at Sotheby's in London.

Gest's work was included in the 1998 retrospective, "The Philadelphia Ten" at the Moore College of Art & Design.  Gest was a benefactor of Haverford College with a religious theme. and the Haverford College Quaker & Special Collections offers a "Gest Fellowship"

References

External links
 images of Margaret Gest's work on the Smithsonian American Art Museum website

1900 births 
1965 deaths
20th-century American women artists
Pennsylvania Academy of the Fine Arts alumni